The California executive branch consists of elected officers and other offices and officers. The elected executive officers are:

Employees 

Total number of employees is 227,536 excluding California State Universities. In 2004, there were 4,462 job classifications, many of which had no employees occupying the position, as a workaround for certain hiring practices. As part of a civil service reform initiative beginning in 2013, 700 job titles were eliminated.

The California Department of Human Resources primarily oversees the state's civil service system, with some additional functions handled by the California State Personnel Board.

1979 Little Hoover Commission report 
In 1979, then-Governor Jerry Brown requested a report on the State's personnel system from the Little Hoover Commission, an independent government oversight agency, which resulted in several recommendations of which some were implemented, including the creation of the Department of Personnel Administration but other recommendations such as the dissolution of the California State Personnel Board were not. In the 1980s, a recommendation to decentralize hiring to departments was implemented.

2010s modernization initiative 
In 2012, California Department of Human Resources was created by combining the functions the former Department of Personnel Administration (DPA) with most of the operations of the State Personnel Board, largely implementing recommendations by experts in the prior decades.

In 2012, the California Government Operations Agency was created under Governor Jerry Brown. Its director, Marybel Batjer, launched an initiative of civil service reform intended to make state employment more attractive to talented employees relative to the private sector.

In 2015, the first engagement survey of state employees was conducted using a sample of 5,000. The survey showed that employees largely believed that their work was important, but did not strongly believe that workers were held accountable or that they received proper recognition for good work.

In 2016, the state rolled out a new hiring website, for the first time allowing for electronic job applications for state jobs. Unusually, it was programmed by state employees rather than an external contractor.

Governor

Agencies under the direction of a secretary that report directly to the governor are cabinet-level agencies. Some agencies such as the state controller, attorney general, and insurance commissioner are headed by independent elected officials. The state auditor is appointed by the governor with confirmation by the legislature, but operates independently of both. 

One relatively new top-level agency, California Government Operations Agency, was created in 2012 to help modernize the government.

Independent entities 

State Board of Education
State Superintendent of Public Instruction
California Department of Education
Insurance Commissioner
California Department of Insurance
Secretary of State
Lieutenant Governor
State Controller
State Treasurer
State Board of Equalization
Attorney General
Department of Justice
Board of Governors, Community Colleges
California Postsecondary Education Commission
California Student Aid Commission
Trustees of State Universities
University of California Board of Regents
Fair Political Practices Commission
California Gambling Commission
State Lands Commission
California Lottery Commission
Public Employment Relations Board
California Public Utilities Commission
California Transportation Commission

Overview
Generally, a Cabinet-level head of an agency in California holds the title of "secretary", while the head of a department holds the title of "director." Exceptions include the head of the Department of the California Highway Patrol, whose title is actually "commissioner."

The vast majority of state government agencies and departments are headquartered in Sacramento or in parts of Sacramento County near the city of Sacramento; in turn, the larger agencies and departments also have local offices around the state which report to headquarters in Sacramento. Notable exceptions include the California Public Utilities Commission and the California Department of Industrial Relations, which are both headquartered in San Francisco.

History
Other defunct statewide elected offices that no longer exist include the comptroller (which became controller in 1862), the surveyor general (1849–1926), and the clerk of the Supreme Court.

In June 2012, Governor Jerry Brown obtained approval from the legislature to proceed with a reorganization plan.  By July 2013, the business and housing components of BTH will be consolidated with the consumer components of SCSA to form the new Business, Consumer Services and Housing Agency; the remainder of SCSA and the Technology Agency will merge into the new Government Operations Agency; and the transportation components of BTH along with the formerly separate California Transportation Commission will become part of the new Transportation Agency.

See also
California
Government of California
Politics of California

References

Politics of California